Rockinghorse is the second studio album by Canadian singer-songwriter Alannah Myles, released on October 13, 1992, by Atlantic Records. It spawned five singles, "Song Instead of a Kiss", "Tumbleweed", "Our World, Our Times", "Living on a Memory", and "Sonny Say You Will" (the first one of which Myles co-wrote). The album was nominated for Best Rock Vocal Performance, Female at the 35th Annual Grammy Awards.

Track listing

Personnel 
Musicians
 Alannah Myles – vocals 
 David Tyson – keyboards, bass, backing vocals 
 Kurt Schefter – guitars
 David Wipper – acoustic guitars, mandolin
 Buzz Feiten – electric guitars (5)
 Will Lee – bass
 Denny Fongheiser – drums, percussion 
 Jørn Andersen – additional cymbals (1)
 Larry Williams – saxophones
 Greg Smith – baritone saxophone (2, 4)
 Gary Grant – trumpets
 John Elefante – backing vocals 
 Mark Free – backing vocals 
 Tommy Funderburk – backing vocals 
 Christopher Ward – backing vocals 
 Rose Stone – backing vocals

Production
 Produced by David Tyson
 Executive Producer – Christopher Ward
 Engineered by Brian Foraker
 Additional Engineering by Brad Aldredge, Richard Benoit, Bill Dooley and Peter Willis.
 Assistant Engineers – Brad Aldredge, Peter Doell, Jeff Graham, Efren Herrera, Leslie Ann Kones, Dominique Schafer, Scott Stillman and Ben Wallach.
 Tracks 1-5, 7, 8 & 9 mixed by Tom Lord-Alge
 Tracks 6 & 10 mixed by Brian Foraker
 Recorded at Brooklyn Recording (Brooklyn, New York); Capitol Studios and A&M Studios (Hollywood, California), Saturn Sound (Studio City, California); Mad Dog Studios (Burbank, California); Westlake Audio and The Complex (Los Angeles, California).
 Mixed at Image Recording Studios and Westlake Audio (Los Angeles, California).
 Mastered by Stephen Marcussen at Precision Mastering (Hollywood, California).
 Production Coordinator – Shari Sutcliffe
 Cover Photography – Reisig & Taylor
 Creative Director and Wardrobe Design – Alannah Myles
 Art Direction and Design – Tom Bricker
 Atlantic Records Creative Director –Melanie Nissen
 Creative Design – Lisa Panagapka for Alannahworks
 Make-up – Michael Bonneville
 Hair Design – Helen Chudoba
 Management – Borman Entertainment

Charts

Weekly charts

Year-end charts

Certifications

References

1992 albums
Alannah Myles albums
Atlantic Records albums
Albums recorded at A&M Studios
Albums recorded at Capitol Studios
Albums recorded at Westlake Recording Studios